Ahmed Zaman Chowdhury (28 December 1947 – 6 March 2013) was a Bangladeshi film journalist, screenwriter and lyricist. He won Bangladesh National Film Award for Best Screenplay for the film Jadur Banshi (1977). Besides, he won Bachsas Award and Fazlul Haq Memorial Award.

Early life and career
Chowdhury completed his bachelor's degree in sociology from the University of Dhaka. While he was a student, he took up a part-time job at the weekly film magazine Chitrali of which he later went on to become the editor. Chowdhury gave up teaching at the University of Dhaka.

Chowdhury wrote screenplays, dialogues, and stories films including Peech-dhala Poth, Notun Naame Dako, Naacher Putul, Baadi Theke Begum, Aagun, Jadur Bashi, Mastaan, Tufaan, Durdesh, Miss Lanka and Love in Singapore.

In later life, Chowdhury emerged as a playwright of the drama plays - Amar Okal Basanta, Kemon Achho Tumi, Onno Rokom Chor, Prescription, Poth Jana Nai and Shaat Konnya. He taught at Stamford University's Film and Media Department.

Chowdhury served as the president of Bangladesh Chalachitra Shangbadik Shomitee (BACHSAS) for three terms.

Personal life
He is the younger brother of writer and translator Fakhruzzaman Chowdhury. His sister-in-law Dilara Zaman (married to Fakhruzzaman Chowdhury) is an actress.

Filmography
Pitch Dhala Poth (1970)
Nacher Putul (1971)
Bandi Theke Begum (1976)
Shesh Uttar (1977)
Door Desh (1983)
Miss Lanka (1985)
Rakkhushi (2004)

References

External links
 

1947 births
2013 deaths
People from Chandpur District
University of Dhaka alumni
Bangladeshi journalists
Bangladeshi screenwriters
Bangladeshi lyricists
Best Screenplay National Film Award (Bangladesh) winners
Burials at Banani Graveyard
Road incident deaths in Bangladesh